Vusala Seyfatdinova (born 11 March 2000) is an Azerbaijani footballer, who plays as a midfielder for Amed S.F.K. in the Turkish Women's Football Super League and the Azerbaijan women's national team.

Club career 

By October 2020, she moved to Turkey, and joined the 2019–20 |Women's First League top club ALG Spor in Gaziantep, which were entitled to play in the 2020–21 UEFA Women's Champions League qualifying rounds. She played in the first qualifying round against the Albanian team KFF Vllaznia Shkodër in Shkodër, Albania on 3 November 2020, and scored one goal.

In February 2022, Seyfatdinova transferred to Çaykur Rizespor to play in the second half of the 2021–22 Turkish Super League. In the first half of the 2022–23 Turkish Super League season, she was with Adana İdman Yurdu. She then moved to Amed S.F.K. to play in the 2022–23 Super League.

International goals

See also 
List of Azerbaijan women's international footballers

References 

2000 births
Living people
Women's association football midfielders
Azerbaijani women's footballers
Azerbaijan women's international footballers
Russian Women's Football Championship players
Ryazan-VDV players
Azerbaijani expatriate footballers
Azerbaijani expatriate sportspeople in Russia
Expatriate women's footballers in Russia
Azerbaijani expatriate sportspeople in Turkey
Expatriate women's footballers in Turkey
ALG Spor players
Turkish Women's Football Super League players
Çaykur Rizespor (women's football) players
Adana İdmanyurduspor players
Amed S.K. (women) players